Malakia ("softness", "weakliness") is an ancient Greek word that means moral weakness or "effeminacy". The contrary characteristic was karteria ("patient endurance", "perseverance").

See also
Homosexuality in ancient Greece
The Bible and homosexuality

References

Effeminacy
Gender roles
Pejorative terms for men
Greek words and phrases